A by-election for the New South Wales Legislative Assembly seat of Miranda occurred on 19 October 2013. The by-election was triggered by the resignation of Graham Annesley, which was announced on 28 August 2013. Barry Collier won the seat with a 55 percent two-party vote from a 26-point two-party swing, the largest swing in New South Wales history.

Background
The Liberal member for Miranda, Graham Annesley, resigned from the New South Wales Parliament and as Minister for Sport and Recreation on 28 August 2013 to take up the post of chief executive officer of the Gold Coast Titans rugby league team. Annesley in his resignation to Parliament said he never regarded himself as a politician and that there were many aspects of politics he did not care for and he has always felt more at home as a sports administrator.

A central Sutherland Shire electorate, Miranda crosses the peninsula between the Georges River and Port Hacking. It includes the suburbs of Como, Bonnet Bay, Oyster Bay, Kareela, Kirrawee, Gymea, Gymea Bay, Grays Point and parts of Sylvania, Miranda and Jannali. The seat's federal equivalent is in the western half of the Division of Cook.

Created in 1971, Miranda had traditionally been a Liberal electorate.  It had only been won by Labor in landslide elections, two under Neville Wran in 1978 and 1981, and again under Bob Carr in 1999 and 2003. According to ABC psephologist Antony Green, the seat should have been recovered by the Liberals in 2007 but was narrowly retained by Labor. Going into the 2011 election, Miranda was Labor's most marginal seat, with a 0.8 percent two-party margin. In the 2011 election, the Liberals won government in a landslide.  In the process, they picked up a large enough swing in Miranda to turn it into a very safe Liberal seat on paper in one stroke, with a 21.0 percent two-party margin. There were 39 seats held by the Coalition on smaller margins.

Campaign
Questions were raised over the Liberal-controlled Sutherland Shire Council's alleged property development favours in their draft Local Environmental Plan.

Internal Liberal Party polling conducted two weeks before the by-election produced a 54–46 lead to Labor indicating a 25-point two-party swing against the Liberal government, however a follow-up internal Liberal Party poll had the Liberals "marginally in front". Sportsbet offered $1.25 for the Liberals against $3.50 for Labor with Antony Green predicting a Liberal retain. Both major party leaders played down expectations of a win.

Dates

Candidates
The six candidates in ballot paper order were:

Results

Labor won the seat with a two-party swing of 26 percent in the largest by-election swing in the state's history, outdoing even the 2010 Penrith by-election result. Premier Barry O'Farrell claimed Annesley's "unexpected, mid-term resignation" as the reason for the loss and rejected claims of a backlash against the Liberal government. Labor's Collier said the major issues for local voters were overdevelopment in the Sutherland Shire, the frequent closure of fire stations (uniformed firefighters were at polling stations protesting against the Liberal government), cuts to TAFE, and poor transport services at the Jannali and Kogarah train stations. Labor leader John Robertson released a statement claiming there was a clear message to the Liberal government from Miranda voters, saying "The people of the shire have sent Barry O'Farrell the strongest of messages tonight ... in the last two-and-a-half years Barry O'Farrell and his government have taken families for granted ... Barry Collier was an outstanding local candidate who ran a strong community campaign, standing up for the Shire against Liberal cuts to services".Graham Annesley resigned.

See also
Electoral results for the district of Miranda
List of New South Wales state by-elections

References

2013 elections in Australia
New South Wales state by-elections
2010s in New South Wales
October 2013 events in Australia